Portland Lutheran School was a private Lutheran school in Portland, Oregon, United States. It had been accredited by the Northwest Association of Accredited Schools since 1948. The school permanently closed in 2015 

The school was originally part of Concordia College, which was founded in 1905. In 1977, the high school was separated from the college and named Portland Lutheran High School. In 1986, classes for pre-K through 8th grade were added, and the name was changed to Portland Lutheran School.

References

High schools in Portland, Oregon
Educational institutions established in 1905
Private middle schools in Oregon
Defunct Christian schools in the United States
Defunct Lutheran schools
Schools accredited by the Northwest Accreditation Commission
Private elementary schools in Oregon
Private high schools in Oregon
1905 establishments in Oregon
Schools affiliated with the Lutheran Church–Missouri Synod
2015 disestablishments in Oregon
Educational institutions disestablished in 2015